Psilocerea tigrinata is a species of moth of the family Geometridae first described by Max Saalmüller in 1880. It is found in Madagascar.

It is leather brown with a wingspan of 42 mm.

References

External links

Ennominae
Moths described in 1880
Moths of Madagascar
Moths of Africa